Steve Williams (born ) is a former Wales international rugby union player. A back row forward, he played his club rugby for Swansea, Neath, Cardiff, London Irish and Northampton RFC and has 29 international caps. He started in the 2002 Powergen Cup Final at Twickenham, as the London Irish defeated the Northampton Saints.

He is the only man to have played 4, 5, 6, 7, and 8 for Wales.

References

External links
Ulster profile
Wales profile

1970 births
Living people
Cardiff RFC players
Ulster Rugby non-playing staff
Wales international rugby union players
Welsh rugby union players
London Irish players